Yin Yue, is a Chinese songwriter, producer, and the writer and editor in chief of the talk show, Morning Call. With her work Blue Parachute, Yin Yue won the Best Lyricist Award of the 25th Oriental Billboard. Yin Yue is also a recipient of Forbes China 30 Under 30 List, Class of 2019. On December 11, 2020, Xiao Juan , lyrics written by Yin Yue, was released.  Other award-winning songs written by Yin Yue include "Silence".

Career 
Yin Yue started her creative career as a writer for the talk show Morning Call. In 2015, Yin Yue became the editor in chief of Morning Call.

Since 2014, Yin Yue has written songs for singers, actors and artists such as Na Ying, Zhou Shen, Tan Weiwei, Faye Wong, Jack Ma, Liang Bo, Hua Chenyu, Lao Lang,  Wang Kai, Jam Hsiao, Sa dingding, Chen Sicheng, Jike Junyi, Huang Ling, Guan Zhe, Aarif Rahman, Huang Xiaoming, Jeff Chang, Jin Zhiwen, Li Yuchun, etc.

On March 26, 2019, Dashi Music Copyright announced that Yin Yue is now represented by the Dashi as a songwriter.

On May 2, 2019, Yin Yue presented four works of hers, "Silence", "Big Fish", "Yesterday: To Buenos Aires " and "Shadow" at the forum of “Mandopop: 40 Years of Chinese Popular Music and Culture”.

In 2020, Yin Yue served as vocal director and producer for Zhou Shen to participate in music competition programs.

Album produced 
“The Deepest Deep": Zhou Shen’s debut album produced and co-written by Yin Yue, was released on Nov 6th, 2017. On March 26th, 2018, Yin Yue won the Best Lyricist Award of the 25th Oriental Billboard for the Blue Parachute from this album.

"3811": on December 11, 2020, Tan Weiwei's album "3811" was officially released, in which Yin Yue wrote lyrics for five songs.

Awards 
In 2018, Yin Yue won the Best Lyricist Award of the 25th Oriental Billboard with her work Blue Parachute.

Forbes China 30 Under 30, Class of 2019

Award-winning works

The song list

References

Date of birth missing (living people)
Chinese songwriters
Year of birth missing (living people)
Living people